"I Believe (A Soulful Re-Recording)" is a single by the British band Tears for Fears. It was the band's eleventh single release, and as a live re-recording of a song from their second LP Songs from the Big Chair, it effectively served as that album's fifth single. It was Tears for Fears' ninth UK Top 40 hit (peaking at #23). The song also reached the Top 10 in Ireland and peaked at #28 in New Zealand.

The song was written by Roland Orzabal who had originally planned to offer it to British musician Robert Wyatt to record, although it was later decided that Tears for Fears would record the song themselves for their album Songs from the Big Chair. Additionally, a cover of Robert Wyatt's "Sea Song" served as the single's B-side. The album version of "I Believe" is dedicated to Wyatt in the liner notes. Roland Orzabal has confirmed the song is about Primal Therapy, particularly in the last line (which includes references to "a newborn scream" and "the shaping of a life").

It was the first Tears for Fears release on which the band itself is listed as producer. Although the single was not released in the United States, the re-recording of the song was done in the midst of the band's 1985 American tour.

In the course of the song, Orzabal shouts "William!" prior to a saxophone solo. The shout was directed to Tears for Fears' touring saxophonist of the time, Will Gregory, best known today as the keyboardist, producer, and composer of the electronic music duo Goldfrapp.

The music video for the song, featuring a shirtless Orzabal (as seen on the single's picture sleeve), was filmed in an aircraft hangar in Seattle, Washington. It was again directed by Nigel Dick.

Track listings

7": Mercury / IDEA11 (UK)
 "I Believe (A Soulful Re-Recording)" (4:35)
 "Sea Song" (3:52)

2x7": Mercury / IDEA1111 (UK)
 "I Believe (A Soulful Re-Recording)" (4:35)
 "Sea Song" (3:52)

 "I Believe (Album Version)" (4:37)
 "Shout (Dub Version)" (6:45)

10": Mercury / IDEA1110 (UK)
 "I Believe (A Soulful Re-Recording)" (4:35)
 "I Believe (Album Version)" (4:37)
 "Sea Song" (3:52)

12": Mercury / IDEA1112 (UK)
 "I Believe (A Soulful Re-Recording)" (4:35)
 "Shout (Dub Version)" (6:45)
 "Sea Song" (3:52)
 "Shout (U.S. Remix)" (8:00)

Credits and personnel
Tears for Fears
Roland Orzabal – lead vocals, grand piano
Curt Smith –  backing vocals, triangle, bass guitar
Ian Stanley – keyboards
Manny Elias – drums

Additional personnel
Will Gregory – saxophone (both studio & live recordings)
Andy Sanders – acoustic guitar (live)
Nicky Holland – piano (live)

Sea Song
Roland Orzabal – lead vocals
Nicky Holland – piano
Ian Stanley – keyboards
David Bascombe – keyboards

Notes

References

Tears for Fears songs
1985 singles
Music videos directed by Nigel Dick
Songs written by Roland Orzabal
1985 songs
Phonogram Records singles
Mercury Records singles